The 19053/19054 Surat - Muzaffarpur Express is an Express train running between Surat of Gujarat and Muzaffarpur of Bihar.

Coach composite

The train consists of 18 coaches:

 1 AC III Tier
 9 Sleeper Class
 6 General Unreserved
 2 Seating cum Luggage Rake

Services

The 19053 Surat - Muzaffarpur Express covers the distance of 2140 km in 46 hours 20 mins(46 km/hr) & in 45 hours 30 mins as 19054 Muzaffarpur - Surat Express (47 km/hr).

As the average speed of the train is below 55 km/h (34 mph), as per Indian Railway rules, its fare doesn't includes a Superfast surcharge.

Route

Reversals

Rake Sharing

The train shares its rake with 12945/12946 Surat - Mahuva Superfast Express.

See also
 Surat - Chhapra Tapti Ganga Express
 Surat - Bhagalpur Tapti Ganga Superfast Express
 Valsad - Muzaffarpur Shramik express
 Udhna - Varanasi Bholenagari Express
 Udhna - Danapur Bi-Weekly Express
 Udhna - Jaynagar Antyodaya Express

References

External links
Surat Muzaffarpur Express at India Rail Info

Rail transport in Bihar
Rail transport in Gujarat
Rail transport in Madhya Pradesh
Transport in Surat
Transport in Muzaffarpur